Othallo Tabia (born 20 October 1983) is a retired Indian professional footballer who last played as a right back for Salgaocar F.C. in the I-League.

References

External links 
 Pune Football Club Profile.

1983 births
Living people
Sportspeople from Thiruvananthapuram
Indian footballers
Mahindra United FC players
Chirag United Club Kerala players
Pune FC players
Salgaocar FC players
Association football fullbacks
Footballers from Kerala
I-League players